is a 2012 Japanese film release, directed by Ryutaro Ninomiya. The film was selected to play at a number of International Festivals, including the International Film Festival Rotterdam, the Subversive festival in 2019,  and was featured at the PIA Film Festival in 2012, where it won the Semi-Grand Prix. The Charm of Others was Ninomiya's first film.

Plot 

The story follows a group of men who are employed at a factory that repairs vending machines. Yoda, one of the men, is a quiet introverted type, tending to keep his distance from his workmates.

A senior worker, Takahashi, takes a dislike to Yoda's attitude which he interprets as rude. Another worker, Oshima, defends Yoda. Another worker, Sakata, greets Yoda every day trying to develop a friendship with him. Takahashi finally abuses Yoda. Yoda then leaves, walking through the city at night, encountering a slightly intoxicated Sakata. The director, Ninomiya, plays one of the main roles

Cast 
 Yoshitaka Hosokawa
 Ryutaro Ninomiya
 Kensuke Ashihara
 Daisuke Udagawa
 Keisuke Minakawa.

Awards and screenings 
The film won the PFF Award Competition 2012, runner up award at the PIA Film Festival. It was screened at a number of film festivals in 2012, starting with the Vancouver International Film Festival (VIFF). The film received an additional screening in 2018 at the 8th ENBU Seminar Cinema Project in Tokyo, Japan.

Reception 
The Bulletin reviewed The Charm of Others when it screened at VIFF, praising the movie's visuals and stating that Ninomiya was  "A director (also, in this case, screenwriter and actor) to be watched."

References 

2010s Japanese-language films
2010s Japanese films